David Benvenisti (1897 in Thessaloniki – 1993 in Jerusalem) a descendant of a known rabbis family in Thessaloniki) was a geographer and educator; received the 'Israel Prize' of 1982 for his life achievements in education and geography of Israel; and the Yakir Yerushalayim in 1969.

Benvenisti was married to Leah Friedman from Suwałki, Poland. His sons are: Meron Benvenisti, a historian and writer who was the deputy mayor of Jerusalem for many years; and Refael (Rafi) Benvenisti, an economist and historian. His grandson is Eyal Benvenisti, a professor of law at Cambridge University.

Biography
David Benvenisti's grandfather Shmuel Yosef was the Chief Justice of the Jewish Court in Thessaloniki. He Emigrated to Palestine in 1913 to pursue  rabbinical studies in Jerusalem. In 1918, on  completing his studies at 'The Hebrew Teachers' College of Jerusalem', he enlisted in the British Army's Hebrew Battalion, recruited from Palestinian Jews in that same year and served during the First World War in Palestine and the Middle East until 1920.

In the 1930s he established with friends the now 'Israel Youth Hostel Association'. He received an M.A. degree in Geography from the Hebrew University of Jerusalem in 1935. He was a member of the Jewish Haganah organization and was wounded in the battle of the siege of Jerusalem in 1948.

Pedagogic and public career
He was a teacher and a principal of an elementary school in Beit Hakerem in Jerusalem for more than 40 years. During his tenure years he refused to leave his pupils for higher positions. He established with friends in 1927 the first 'Palestine Hikers Association' that organized hiking and car tours of Palestine and the Middle East. After retirement from teaching he became in 1964 the first director general of the Ben Zvi Institute for the study of Jewish communities in the East' in Jerusalem and the chairman of the Committee for Naming Roads and Streets of Jerusalem.

Literary career

Benvenisti wrote many teaching books and maps for school on the geography of Israel for many years. He wrote together with his friends one of the first guide books of Palestine after the First World War. He edited books and wrote many articles on the history of the Jewish Community of Thessaloniki. He wrote his memoirs on his childhood in Thessaloniki, his service in the Hebrew Battalion in the First World War, and his years as a teacher and principal of his school.

References

1897 births
1993 deaths
Israeli educators
Israeli geographers
Israeli people of Greek-Jewish descent
Jews from Thessaloniki
20th-century geographers
Greek emigrants to the Ottoman Empire